Brown School can refer to several schools:

 Brown School, a private K-12 school in Schenectady, New York
 The Bishop David Brown School, a comprehensive school in Woking, Surrey formerly known as Sheerwater Secondary School
 Enoch Brown School, known for the Enoch Brown School Massacre
 George R. Brown School of Engineering, at Rice University in Houston, Texas
 George Warren Brown School of Social Work, Washington University in St. Louis
 Hathaway Brown School, in Shaker Heights, Ohio
 J. Graham Brown School, a public K-12 school in Louisville, Kentucky
 Moses Brown School, Religious Society of Friends private school in Providence, Rhode Island
 Samuel Brown School, a historic building in Peabody, Massachusetts

See also
 Browning School
 Brown School of Engineering (disambiguation)
 Enoch Brown School Massacre